Paul-Albert Girard (1839–1920) was a French painter.  Although he painted portraits and landscapes, he is best known as an Orientalist painter of North African scenes.

Life and career

The son of painter Pierre Girard, Albert studied at the École des Beaux-Arts from 1857 under Jean-Joseph Bellel.

He won the Prix de Rome in 1861 for the category 'paysage historique' (Historic landscapes) for his painting entitled, The Procession of Silenus.

His oil painting Ritual Slaying of Cockerels (pictured) is in the collection of Birmingham Museum and Art Gallery.

Gallery

See also

 List of Orientalist artists
 Orientalism

References

External links 

 

1839 births
1920 deaths
19th-century French painters
20th-century French painters
20th-century French male artists
École des Beaux-Arts alumni
Chevaliers of the Légion d'honneur
French male painters
Orientalist painters
19th-century French male artists